The Uppland Runic Inscription 1028  is a Viking Age runestone engraved in Old Norse with the Younger Futhark runic alphabet. It was found by Johannes Bureus outside the church door of Lena Church and it nowadays visible in the wall inside of the church porch. Lena Church is in Uppsala Municipality.

Inscription
Transliteration of the runes into Latin characters

 ... asbiurn · (a)uk i[n]-... ... ...--[k](u)r(u)... ...---...na-... ...anti kuþ suiki · þa iʀ h[a] sui[k]u

Old Norse transcription:

 

English translation:

 "... Ásbjôrn and ... ... ... ... ...-land(?) May God betray those who betrayed him. "

References

Runestones in Uppland